Thompson Noble Kirkham (10 December 1901 – q1 1986) was an English footballer who played as an outside right in the Football League for Darlington.

Kirkham was the third child of Thomas Gallon Kirkham, a lighterman, and his wife Elizabeth Jane. He was born in Felling, County Durham, where the family were living at the time of the 1911 Census. Described as a local lad, Kirkham had displaced Harry Hall from the outside-right position for Darlington by December 1923, and finished the season, and his Football League career, with 19 appearances in the Third Division North and one goal. His death was registered in early 1986 in Gateshead.

References

1901 births
1986 deaths
Footballers from Gateshead
English footballers
Association football wingers
Darlington F.C. players
English Football League players